Five Mile House was a railway station on the Lincolnshire Loop Line which served the village of Fiskerton in Lincolnshire between 1848 and 1964. Situated on the south bank of the River Witham, passengers on the north bank had to use a ferry to reach it. It closed two years after opening due to low traffic, but reopened fifteen years later. Passenger services were withdrawn in 1958, leaving the station open for anglers' excursions until 1964. The Water Rail Way footpath now runs through the site.

History
The station was opened on 17 October 1848 on the south bank of the River Witham near the village of Fiskerton. It was constructed by Peto and Betts civil engineering contractors who, in November 1846, had agreed to construct the line including stations by 28 February 1848. It took its name from a public house near the river which served as a barge inn popular with horse-drawn packets. Two timber-built staggered platforms were provided either side of a crossing which led to a ferry across the river. Users on the north bank of the river were obliged to cross it using the ferry to reach the station, a journey which deterred many potential customers. Lack of traffic resulted in the station closing in 1850, only to reopen fifteen years later when a farmer was granted siding facilities. A footbridge replaced the ferry in 1957 when the latter closed.

Goods traffic was never heavy, and the station was mainly used for transporting potatoes, grain, hay and sugar beet. The station buildings were destroyed by fire in 1919 and were replaced by two small buildings; one was used as an office and the other as a waiting room. By September 1964, only one train each way called at the station.

Present day
The timber platforms remained intact until at least the early 1970s. The Water Rail Way footpath now runs through the site.

References

Sources

 
 
 

Disused railway stations in Lincolnshire
Railway stations in Great Britain opened in 1848
Railway stations in Great Britain closed in 1850
Railway stations in Great Britain opened in 1865
Railway stations in Great Britain closed in 1964
Former Great Northern Railway stations
Beeching closures in England